Attorney General Davis may refer to:

Fred Henry Davis (1894–1937), Attorney General of Florida
Harwell Goodwin Davis (1882–1977), Attorney General of Alabama
Jeff Davis (Arkansas governor) (1862–1913), Attorney General of Arkansas
Thomas Clayton Davis (1889–1960), Attorney General of Saskatchewan

See also
Attorney General Davies (disambiguation)
General Davis (disambiguation)